The 2004–05 Russian Superleague season was the ninth season of the Russian Superleague, the top level of ice hockey in Russia. 16 teams participated in the league, and HC Dynamo Moscow won the championship.

Regular season

Playoffs

3rd place: HC Avangard Omsk − Lokomotiv Yaroslavl 0:2 (3:6, 4:5)

External links
Season on hockeyarchives.ru

Russian Superleague seasons
1